(literally Technical Weekly Magazine) is a Dutch weekly newspaper specialising in engineering topics.

History and profile
In 2005 the magazine was 
sold by publisher VNU to Bèta Publishers, which had grown out of Koninklijke Nederlandse Chemische Vereniging (KNCV).

The focus of Technisch Weekblad is on short reports on technical developments, the job market for engineers and government policies regarding technology. Its income is based on subscriptions and advertising.

Corresponding magazines are Ingeniøren in Denmark, Ny Teknik in Sweden and Teknisk Ukeblad in Norway.

References

External links
 

Dutch-language magazines
Weekly magazines published in the Netherlands
Engineering magazines
Science and technology magazines published in the Netherlands
Magazines established in 1994
Mass media in The Hague